The 2019 TBL season is the second season of The Basketball League (TBL) after one season as North American Premier Basketball (NAPB).

After the first NAPB season, league president Dave Magley acquired the league as sole owner, moved the headquarters to Indiana, and named Evelyn Magley as the new CEO. On July 14, the league was rebranded as The Basketball League. On August 16, 2018, Paul Mokeski was named the commissioner of the league after having served the previous season as head coach and general manager of the Nevada Desert Dogs.

During the previous season, four expansion teams were announced for 2019 in the Raleigh Firebirds, San Diego Waves, Tampa Bay Titans, and a Bellevue, Washington-based team. After the league rebrand, the Bellevue team, the Ohio Bootleggers, and the Vancouver Knights were no longer mentioned as members for the 2019 season. The Basketball League also added the Jamestown Jackals from the North American Basketball League and the New York Court Kings from the American Basketball Association. The Nevada Desert Dogs were renamed the Mesquite Desert Dogs and the Kentucky Thoroughbreds were renamed the Owensboro Thoroughbreds. Upon the 2019 season schedule release, the Rochester Razorsharks were also removed from the league.

During the season, there were many canceled and rescheduled games. The league apparently cut its season short with the New York Court Kings and Kansas City Tornadoes either folding or ceasing operations for the season.

Standings
Final standings:

Playoffs
There were ten teams in the league with the top four teams qualifying for the playoffs. The second place Kansas City Tornadoes elected not to participate in the playoffs. The semifinals were split in a generalized East and West series despite not having divisions during the regular season. Each round of the playoffs were played as a best-of-three series.

Draft
The 2019 player draft for the league was held on December 3, 2018, and the league's ten teams took turns selecting players who had all competed at the college level in the United States at some point.

Julian Harris of UT Arlington was the first overall TBL selection taken by Raleigh Firebirds.

Although some of the players chosen in the draft had played semi-professional or professional basketball after college graduation, only the United States colleges they attended are listed.

References

External links

The Basketball League seasons
TBL Draft